William Fleetwood (1656–1723) was Bishop of St Asaph and Bishop of Ely.

William Fleetwood may also refer to:
 William Fleetwood (judge) (c. 1535–1594), English barrister, politician, and judge
 William Fleetwood (died 1630) (1563–1630), English politician
 William Fleetwood (1603–1674), English courtier and politician

See also
William Fleetwood Sheppard (1863–1936), Australian-British civil servant, mathematician and statistician